The term Anti-Western may refer to:

 Anti-Western sentiment, negative sentiments and animosities towards people from the West
 Revisionist Western or anti-Western (genre), in cinematography - particular genre of the Western movies.

See also
 
 Anti-Eastern (disambiguation)
 Anti-Western sentiment in China